Diego Ignacio Sánchez Carvajal (born 8 May 1987) is a Chilean footballer that currently plays for the Primera División club Coquimbo Unido as a goalkeeper.

Club career

Early career
Born in Santiago, Sánchez joined Palestino youth ranks aged twelve thanks to his father Gustavo that played there during the 1980s and was member of the team's 1986 Primera División runner-up squad. Diego was promoted to Palestino first adult team in 2007 by Luis Musrri (club's coach), because the bad shape of Fernando Burgos in the goal, and the injury of first-choice Felipe Núñez. On 8 August, he made his debut against Universidad Católica in a 1–1 draw at Estadio Nacional, playing another four games that season.

In January 2008, Sánchez was loaned to third-tier side Unión Temuco, for then the next season join cross–town rivals Deportes Temuco, for finally move to Barnechea in 2010, being all of those third-level teams. Because his well performances he join first-tier club Unión San Felipe in 2011, where in his second game against Universidad de Chile was the man of the match in a 2–0 away win. However, the next season San Felipe relegated to Primera B and Sánchez was released of Aconcagua Valley-based team.

In December 2022, he joined Coquimbo Unido for the 2023 season.

International career
Sánchez got his first call up to the senior Chile squad for friendlies against Venezuela and Uruguay in November 2014.

Honours

Club
Unión Española
 Torneo de Transición (1): 2013
 Supercopa de Chile (1): 2013

References

External links
 
 
 Diego Sánchez Carvajal at Football-Lineups

1987 births
Living people
Footballers from Santiago
Chilean footballers
Club Deportivo Palestino footballers
Unión Temuco footballers
Deportes Temuco footballers
A.C. Barnechea footballers
Unión San Felipe footballers
Unión Española footballers
C.D. Antofagasta footballers
Coquimbo Unido footballers
Chilean Primera División players
Tercera División de Chile players
Association football goalkeepers